Kawkhali Upazila may refer to:

Kawkhali Upazila, Pirojpur
Kawkhali Upazila, Rangamati